Geelvink Channel is a feature to the east of the Houtman Abrolhos  in the Indian Ocean off the coast of Western Australia, that lies between the Abrolhos and the port of Geraldton.

It is a feature that has whale movements and oil and gas exploration researched for effects of seismic exploration methods.

Charts

References